Ekiriya  is a village in Sri Lanka. It is located within Central Province. All the people living in Ekiriya are buddhist.

Postal Code : 20732

See also
List of towns in Central Province, Sri Lanka

External links

Populated places in Kandy District